Zgornja Senica (in older sources also Gorenja Senica) is a village north of Goričane in the Municipality of Medvode in the Upper Carniola region of Slovenia.

References

External links

Zgornja Senica on Geopedia

Populated places in the Municipality of Medvode